The 1941 Wayne Tartars football team represented Wayne University (later renamed Wayne State University) as an independent during the 1941 college football season. The Tartars compiled a 2–6 record and were outscored by opponents, 204 to 24. The Tartars two victories were over Central Michigan (6–0) and Michigan State Normal (12–0).

The team's head coach was Joe Gembis in his tenth season. His assistant coaches were Joseph Truskowski and Ox Emerson.

Prior to the season, Wayne conducted its preseason training camp at Mio, Michigan.  Coach Gembis had expected 15 lettermen to return from his 1940 team that had compiled a 4–1–3 record. However, the military draft intervened, and seven of the team's 15 returning lettermen were in the Army at the start of the 1941 season with two more waiting to be inducted. Another had joined the Michigan State Police.

After the team lost its first three games without scoring a point, Gembis came under fire for the team's poor performance, despite coaching at a school with approximately 10,000 students.

Tom Kennedy played at the tackle position for the 1941 Wayne team. In 1944, he played two games for the Detroit Lions, the first Wayne alumnus to play in the National Football League.

Schedule

References

Wayne
Wayne State Warriors football seasons
Wayne Tartars football